Kerala Government Polytechnic College is located at West Hill, 5 km away from Kozhikode city on the roadside of Kozhikode Kannur N.H.17 Road. A place near Industrial Estate, Westhill.  
The institution was started as Industrial School and later upgraded as Kerala Polytechnic and later renamed as Kerala Govt. Polytechnic College, Kozhikode. 
The institution is now under the control of Directorate of Technical Education formed by the Government of Kerala

About

The Kerala Govt Polytechnic College, Westhill was established in 1946, one of the oldest polytechnic colleges in Kerala. The college was inaugurated by Sri. V V Giri, bar-at-law, minister for industries and labour, Government of Madras on 23 November 1946. Sri. Sreenivas Rao was the first principal. Over time, the intake of students increased; six full-fledged departments currently offer six engineering diploma programmes such as Civil Engineering, Computer Engineering, Chemical Engineering, Mechanical Engineering, Electrical & Electronics Engineering, Tool & Die Engineering under the Department of Technical Education, Kerala. The college has approximately 1200 students, 90 teaching staff and 28 non-teaching staff. All the departments of the college are adequately staffed and well-equipped to meet the needs of the latest technological trends and international standards. for Admission :polyadmission.org

History
KGPTC was established in 1946 as Kerala Polytechnic under the Madras Government. The school originally offered 4 diploma standard courses and five certificate standard courses.

The diploma courses were Civil engineering, Mechanical engineering, Electrical engineering and Chemical engineering.

Notable alumni
 Sasi Kalinga, Actor, Malayalam film industry

VISION

"To be the best technical hub in the country, creating technicians of global standards with excellent skills, knowledge and social commitment"

MISSION
 To provide excellent foundation for acquiring technical knowledge by imparting quality education. 
 To create congenial academic ambiance that stimulate innovative thinking.
 To equip the students with employability skills.
 To develop integrity through conduct, character, discipline and high value system to meet the needs of industry and society.

Other Programmes

List of other schemes/activities implemented
 Community Development through Polytechnics 
 Industry Institute Partnership Cell 
 Visiting Faculty Scheme 
 Finishing School 
 D Skill Course for Disabled 
 Continuing Education Cell

Departments
 Civil Engineering
 Mechanical Engineering
 Electrical & Electronics Engineering
 Chemical Engineering
 Computer Engineering
 Tool & Die Engineering

References

Universities and colleges in Kozhikode
Engineering colleges in Kerala